The 2007 season was the Arizona Cardinals' 88th in the National Football League, their 20th in Arizona and their first under head coach Ken Whisenhunt.  They improved upon their 5–11 record in 2006 after finishing last place in the NFC West, by finishing 8–8, but the failure of the Cardinals to qualify for the Super Bowl marked the 23rd consecutive year in which the Super Bowl did not include the team in whose region the game was being played in; Super Bowl XIV and Super Bowl XIX were the only postseasons with such an occurrence before 2007.

Two losses to the San Francisco 49ers, who won only five games that season, came back to haunt them in the end, as they were mathematically eliminated from playoff contention for the ninth straight season. Nonetheless, Pro Football Reference argues that the 2007 Cardinals had the easiest schedule of any non-playoff team since the 1965 Eagles: they never opposed any team with a better record than 10–6 in any of their sixteen games.

Offseason

Free agents heading into the 2007 season

Free agents signed for 2007 season

Draft

Head coach
Head coach Ken Whisenhunt entered his first year of his term with the Cardinals. He was previously the offensive coordinator for the Pittsburgh Steelers.  Whisenhunt signed a contract with the Cardinals on January 14, 2007 after the Cardinals released former head coach Dennis Green.

Roster

Staff

Schedule
In the 2007 regular season, the Cardinals’ non-divisional, conference opponents were primarily from the NFC South, although they also played the Washington Redskins from the NFC East, and the Detroit Lions from the NFC North. Their non-conference opponents were from the AFC North.

Note: Intra-division opponents are in bold text.

Standings

Game summaries

Week 1

The Cardinals began their 2007 campaign on the road against their NFC West foe, the San Francisco 49ers.  In the first quarter, Arizona trailed early as 49ers RB Frank Gore got a 6-yard TD run for the only score of the period.  In the second quarter, the Cardinals took the lead with kicker Neil Rackers getting a 35-yard field goal, while RB Edgerrin James got a 7-yard TD run.  San Francisco would tie the game with kicker Joe Nedney getting a 33-yard field goal.

In the third quarter, the 49ers regained the lead with Nedney kicking a 30-yard field goal for the only score of the period.  In the fourth quarter, the Cardinals retook the lead with QB Matt Leinart completing a 5-yard TD pass to WR Anquan Boldin.  However, late in the game, the Cards' defense failed to hold off San Francisco's ensuing drive, which ended with WR Arnaz Battle getting a 1-yard TD run.  With just over :20 seconds left in the game, Arizona had one final chance to save the game. Leinart's pass to WR Larry Fitzgerald was intercepted by 49ers CB Shawntae Spencer.

With the heartbreaking loss, the Cardinals began their season at 0–1.

Scoring summary

Q1 – SF – 11:24 – Frank Gore 6-yard TD run (Joe Nedney kick) (SF 7–0)

Q2 – ARI – 12:55 – Neil Rackers 35-yard FG (SF 7–3)

Q2 – ARI – 9:15 – Edgerrin James 7-yard TD run (Rackers kick) (ARI 10–7)

Q2 – SF – 3:40 – Joe Nedney 33-yard FG (10–10)

Q3 – SF – 11:20 – Joe Nedney 30-yard FG (SF 13–10)

Q4 – ARI – 6:46 – 5-yard TD pass from Matt Leinart to Anquan Boldin (Rackers kick) (ARI 17–13)

Q4 – SF – 0:26 – Arnaz Battle 1-yard TD run (Nedney kick) (SF 20–17)

Week 2

Hoping to rebound from their tough divisional road loss to the 49ers, the Cardinals played their Week 2 homeopener against another NFC West foe, the Seattle Seahawks.  In the first quarter, the Cards took to the skies first with kicker Neil Rackers getting a 28-yard field goal for the only score of the period.  In the second quarter, Arizona continued to pound away with QB Matt Leinart completing a 30-yard TD pass to TE Leonard Pope, along RB Edgerrin James getting a 17-yard TD run.  The Seahawks would get their only score of the half with QB Matt Hasselbeck completing a 24-yard TD pass to WR Nate Burleson.

In the third quarter, the Cardinals' lead was gone with Seattle RB Shaun Alexander getting a 16-yard TD run and kicker Josh Brown getting a 28-yard field goal.  In the fourth quarter, the Cards trailed as Brown got another 28-yard field goal.  Arizona responded with Rackers kicking a 52-yard field goal.  Late in the game, the Cards defense managed to recover a Seahawk fumble.  It would eventually turn into Rackers' 4th career game-winning field goal as made it from 42 yards out as time ran out.

With the win, the Cardinals improved to 1–1.

Scoring summary:

Q1 – ARZ – 1:27 – Neil Rackers 28-yard FG (ARZ 3–0)

Q2 – ARZ – 14:07 – Leonard Pope 30-yard pass from Matt Leinart (Neil Rackers kick) (ARZ 10–0)

Q2 – ARZ – 5:43 – Edgerrin James 17-yard run (Neil Rackers kick) (ARZ 17–0)

Q2 – SEA – 1:16 – Nate Burleson 24-yard pass from Matt Hasselbeck (Josh Brown kick) (ARZ 17–7)

Q3 – SEA – 8:42 – Shaun Alexander 16-yard run (Josh Brown kick) (ARZ 17–14)

Q3 – SEA – 3:34 – Josh Brown 28-yard FG (17–17)

Q4 – SEA – 9:52 – Josh Brown 28-yard FG (SEA 20–17)

Q4 – ARZ – 4:44 – Neil Rackers 52-yard FG (20–20)

Q4 – ARZ – 0:01 – Neil Rackers 42-yard FG (ARZ 23–20)

Week 3

Coming off their divisional home win over the Seahawks, the Cardinals flew to M&T Bank Stadium for an intraconference "bird" battle with the Baltimore Ravens. In the first quarter, the Ravens flew first with kicker Matt Stover getting a 21-yard field goal for the only score of the period.  In the second quarter, the Ravens increased their lead with Stover's 28-yard field goal.  Arizona would manage to get on the board with kicker Neil Rackers getting a 48-yard field goal, yet Baltimore managed to put more and more distance from the Cards with QB Steve McNair completing a 13-yard TD pass to WR Derrick Mason, along with WR/PR Yamon Figurs returning a punt 75 yards for a touchdown.

In the third quarter, the Cardinals managed to get a 40-yard field goal from Rackers, yet the Ravens continued its domination with Stover getting a 43-yard field goal.  In the fourth quarter, with QB Matt Leinart being ineffective, back-up QB Kurt Warner came in and ignited the Cards' offense with a 5-yard TD pass and a 32-yard TD pass to WR Anquan Boldin.  Afterwards, Arizona tied the game with Rackers getting a 41-yard field goal.  The Ravens got a last-second win with Stover nailing a 46-yard field goal.

With the loss, the Cardinals fell to 1–2.

Week 4

Trying to rebound from their road loss to the Ravens, the Cardinals went home for another interconference fight, as they would face the Pittsburgh Steelers. In the first quarter, Arizona trailed as Steelers QB Ben Roethlisberger completed a 43-yard TD pass to WR Santonio Holmes for the only score of the quarter.  However, in the third quarter, the Cards started to fight back.  As starting QB Matt Leinart struggled, back-up QB Kurt Warner came in and completed a 6-yard TD pass to WR Jerheme Urban for the only score of the period.  In the fourth quarter, Leinart was put back in and the Cardinals didn't miss a beat as rookie WR Steve Breaston returned a punt 73 yards for a touchdown, along with RB Edgerrin James getting a 2-yard TD pass.  However, Pittsburgh retaliated as Roethlisberger and Holmes hooked up with each other again on a 7-yard TD pass.  Afterwards, Arizona held off an attempt to tie the game and won. Both teams would eventually meet again in Super Bowl XLIII.

With the win, the Cardinals improved to 2–2.

Week 5

Coming off their impressive home win over the Steelers, the Cardinals flew to the Edward Jones Dome for a Week 5 divisional duel with the winless St. Louis Rams. In the first quarter, Arizona trailed early with Rams kicker Jeff Wilkins getting a 46-yard field goal.  The Cards would tie the game with kicker Neil Rackers getting a 50-yard field goal. In the second quarter, the Cardinals trailed again with QB Gus Frerotte completing a 16-yard TD pass to WR Drew Bennett.  Arizona would tie the game with RB Edgerrin James fumbling at the 1-yard line and OG Reggie Wells recovering the fumble in the endzone for a touchdown.  However, on the Cards next possession, QB Matt Leinart was sacked by MLB Will Witherspoon, causing his left collarbone to get broken, getting him out for the rest of the game.  Back-up QB Kurt Warner (former Rams QB) came in for the rest of the game.  Afterwards, St. Louis would respond with Wilkins kicking a 35-yard field goal.  Afterwards, Arizona would end the half with Warner getting a 1-yard TD run.

In the third quarter, the Rams retook the lead with Frerotte completing an 11-yard TD pass to WR Torry Holt.  Afterwards, the Cards would tie the game with Rackers getting a 32-yard field goal.  In the fourth quarter, the Cards increased its lead with CB Roderick Hood returning an interception 68 yards for a touchdown.  St. Louis tried to pass the Cardinals for the lead as Wilkins got a 31-yard field goal.  Arizona increased its lead with Warner's 7-yard TD pass to WR Larry Fitzgerald.  The Rams would get close with Frerotte's 29-yard TD pass to TE Randy McMichael, followed up with a successful two-point conversion pass from Frerotte to Holt.  The Cards would emerge victorious.

With the win, the Cardinals improved to 3–2.

Week 6

Coming off their divisional road win over the Rams, the Cardinals went home for a Week 6 intraconference game against the Carolina Panthers and QB Vinny Testaverde, whom Arizona tried to sign for to back up Warner, yet failed.  Backing up Warner for the remainder of the year would be QB Tim Rattay, whom the Cards recently signed.

In the first quarter, the Cardinals trailed early as Panthers kicker John Kasay kicked a 33-yard field goal for the only score of the period.  In the second quarter, Arizona continued to trail as Kasay gave Carolina a 43-yard field goal.  The Cards would take the lead with RB Edgerrin James getting a 23-yard TD run.  In the third quarter, the Panthers jumped back in front again with Kasay getting a 24-yard field goal.  Arizona would retake the lead with kicker Neil Rackers getting a 50-yard field goal.  In the fourth quarter, the Cards lost control as Carolina took control with Testaverde completing a 65-yard TD pass to WR Steve Smith, Kasay nailing a 45-yard field goal, and RB DeAngelo Williams getting a 13-yard TD run.

With the loss, not only did the Cardinals fall to 3–3, but starting QB Kurt Warner (2/2 for 21 yards) left the game in the first quarter with a strained left elbow.

Week 7

Hoping to rebound from their home loss to the Panthers, the Cardinals flew to FedExField for a Week 7 duel with former division rival Washington Redskins. QB Kurt Warner got the start, despite having a torn left elbow ligament.

In the first quarter, Arizona trailed early as Redskins RB Clinton Portis got a 2-yard TD run for the only score of the period.  In the second quarter, things got worse for the Cards as Warner's second interception was returned by LB London Fletcher 27 yards for a touchdown.  Arizona would finally respond as Warner threw a 2-yard TD pass to WR Anquan Boldin (with a failed PAT).

In the third quarter, the Cards continued to struggle as Portis gave Washington a 1-yard TD run for the only score of the period.  In the fourth quarter, Arizona managed to draw close with Warner and Boldin hooking up with each other again on a 10-yard TD pass, along with back-up QB Tim Rattay completing a 1-yard TD pass to TE Leonard Pope (with a failed 2-point conversion).  The Cards would recover their onside kick and even get into position to get a game-winning 55-yard field goal from kicker Neil Rackers.  The kick went wide left, securing their second-straight loss.

With the loss, the Cardinals entered their bye week at 3–4.

Week 9

Coming off their bye week, the Cardinals flew to Raymond James Stadium for a Week 9 intraconference duel with the Tampa Bay Buccaneers.  In the first quarter, the Cards flew first with kicker Neil Rackers getting a 47-yard field goal.  However, the Buccaneers took the lead with QB Jeff Garcia completing a 37-yard TD pass to WR Joey Galloway.  In the second quarter, Arizona continued to struggle as Tampa Bay kicker Matt Bryant nailed a 32-yard field goal for the only score of the period.

In the third quarter, the Cardinals continued to trail as Buccaneers RB Earnest Graham got a 2-yard TD run.  In the fourth quarter, Arizona began to fight back as RB Edgerrin James got a 3-yard TD run.  Late in the game, during the Cards last offensive drive, QB Kurt Warner would get intercepted by Safety Jermaine Phillips.  Even though replays clearly showed that he didn't stay in bounds, Arizona was out of timeouts and therefore were unable to challenge the play. It would be remembered as the most controversial call in 2007.

With the loss, the Cardinals fell to 3–5.

Week 10

Trying to snap a three-game losing skid, the Cardinals went home for a Week 10 duel with the Detroit Lions. In the first quarter, Arizona trailed early as Lions RB Kevin Jones got a 4-yard TD run.  The Cards would reply with kicker Neil Rackers nailing a 23-yard field goal. In the second quarter, the Cardinals took the lead with QB Kurt Warner completing a 1-yard TD pass to WR Larry Fitzgerald, while back-up QB Tim Rattay completed a 2-yard TD pass to TE Leonard Pope.

In the third quarter, Arizona continued its scorching as Warner completed a 16-yard TD pass to Pope.  Detroit would respond with Kitna completing a 7-yard TD pass to WR Roy Williams.  In the fourth quarter, the Cards pulled away with Warner and Fitzgerald hooking up with each other again on a 20-yard TD pass.  The Lions' last score would be another 7-yard TD pass from Kitna to Williams.

With the win, the Cardinals improved to 4–5.

Week 11

    
    
    
    
    
    
    
    
    
    

Coming off their home win over the Lions, the Cardinals flew to Paul Brown Stadium for a Week 11 interconference duel with the Cincinnati Bengals. In the first quarter, the Cards trailed early as Bengals QB Carson Palmer completing a 19-yard TD pass to WR T.J. Houshmandzadeh. Arizona responded via CB Antrel Rolle returning an interception 55 yards for a touchdown. In the second quarter, the Bengals responded with kicker Shayne Graham getting a 41-yard field goal. The Cardinals would take the lead with QB Kurt Warner completing a 44-yard TD pass to WR Anquan Boldin.  Cincinnati tried to reply as Graham kicked a 38-yard field goal. Arizona answered with Warner completing a 5-yard TD pass to WR Larry Fitzgerald.

In the third quarter, the Cards increased their lead with RB Edgerrin James getting a 3-yard TD run.  The Bengals tried to come back as Palmer completed a 37-yard to WR Chris Henry, while RB DeDe Dorsey returning a blocked punt 19 yards for a touchdown.  Arizona held to win as Rolle returned his second interception 54 yards for a touchdown.

With the win, the Cardinals improved to 5–5.

Antrel Rolle, who had three interceptions, returning two of them for touchdowns, became the 18th player in NFL history to have three interceptions in one game.

Week 12

Coming off an impressive road win over the Bengals, the Cardinals went home for a Week 12 NFC West rematch with the San Francisco 49ers. In the first quarter, the Cards took flight early as QB Kurt Warner completed a 28-yard touchdown reception to WR Larry Fitzgerald. The 49ers responded with QB Trent Dilfer completing a 2-yard TD pass to TE Vernon Davis. In the second quarter, San Francisco took the lead via kicker Joe Nedney hitting a 19-yard field goal and running back Frank Gore getting an 11-yard TD run. Afterwards, Arizona regained the lead with RB Marcel Shipp getting a 1-yard TD run & Warner hooking up with Fitzgerald again on a 48-yard TD run.

However, in the third quarter, the 49ers retook the lead with Dilfer completing a 57-yard TD pass to WR Arnaz Battle for the only score of the period.  In the fourth quarter, the Cardinals regained the lead with QB Tim Rattay completing a 2-yard TD pass to rookie TE Ben Patrick.  Afterwards, San Francisco got the lead again with Gore getting a 35-yard TD run.  Then, the Cards tied the game with kicker Neil Rackers getting a 19-yard field goal.  In overtime, Arizona had a chance to win the game with a 32-yard field goal.  The kick was good, but a delay of game penalty wiped it away.  On the second try, Rackers missed it wide left.  In the end, the 49ers got the win with Warner fumbling the ball after getting hit in his endzone and LB Tully Banta-Cain falling on it for the touchdown and the win.

With the loss, the Cardinals fell to 5–6, despite Warner throwing a career-best 484 yards.

Week 13

Hoping to rebound from their tough divisional home loss to the 49ers, the Cardinals stayed at home for a Week 13 interconference duel with the Cleveland Browns.  In the first quarter, Arizona jumped out to an early lead as CB Roderick Hood returned an interception 71 yards for a touchdown, along with QB Kurt Warner's 5-yard TD pass to TE Leonard Pope. The Browns would get on the board with kicker Phil Dawson getting a 37-yard field goal.  In the second quarter, Cleveland drew close as QB Derek Anderson completed a 6-yard TD pass to RB Jamal Lewis for the only score of the period.

In the third quarter, the Cards responded with Warner completing a 1-yard TD pass to WR Bryant Johnson.  However, the Browns drew closer as Anderson completed a 67-yard TD pass to WR Braylon Edwards (with WR/KR/PR Joshua Cribbs completing a 2-point conversion pass to TE Kellen Winslow).  In the fourth quarter, Arizona added on to its lead with kicker Neil Rackers getting a 33-yard field goal, while Dawson gave Cleveland a 22-yard field goal.  Afterwards, the Cards increased its lead with Rackers nailing a 19-yard field goal.  However, the Browns had one final shot towards the end zone.  Anderson's pass to Winslow ended up being caught out of bounds. Replays seemed to indicate Winslow was forced out, which would have been good for a touchdown had it been called on the field. But force-outs are not reviewable, so the touchdown did not count and the Cardinals survived.

With the win, the Cardinals improved to 6–6.

Week 14

Coming off their home win over the Browns, the Cardinals flew to Qwest Field for a Week 14 NFC West rematch with the Seattle Seahawks.  In the first quarter, Arizona trailed early as Seahawks kicker Josh Brown managed to get a 23-yard field goal, along with QB Matt Hasselbeck completing a 7-yard TD pass to WR Nate Burleson.  In the second quarter, the Cards continued to trail as Hasselbeck completed a 15-yard TD pass to WR Bobby Engram and a 17-yard TD pass to WR Deion Branch.  The Cardinals would get on the board as QB Kurt Warner completed a 5-yard TD pass to WR Bryant Johnson, yet Seattle increased their lead prior to halftime with Brown kicking a 41-yard field goal.

In the third quarter, the Cards tried to rally as Warner completed a 2-yard TD pass to WR Jerheme Urban for the only score of the period.  However, in the fourth quarter, the Seahawks pulled away as Hasselbeck completed a 3-yard TD pass to TE Marcus Pollard, RB Josh Scobey tackling Cardinals punter Mitch Berger in the end zone for a safety, and CB Marcus Trufant returning an interception 84 yards for a touchdown (with a failed PAT).  Arizona tried to come back as Warner completed an 11-yard TD pass to WR Larry Fitzgerald.  However, Seattle's defense was too much to overcome.

With the loss, the Cardinals fell to 6–7.

During this game, Kurt Warner threw a career-worst five interceptions.

Week 15

Hoping to recover from their divisional road loss to the Seahawks, the Cardinals flew to the Louisiana Superdome for a Week 15 intraconference duel with the New Orleans Saints.  In the first quarter, the Cardinals took flight as QB Kurt Warner completed a 1-yard TD pass to TE Troy Bienemann.  The Saints responded with QB Drew Brees completing a 19-yard TD pass to WR Marques Colston.  In the second quarter, Arizona trailed as RB Aaron Stecker got a 1-yard TD run.  The Cardinals would tie the game Warner completing an 18-yard TD pass to WR Larry Fitzgerald.  However, New Orleans took the lead with Brees completing a 32-yard TD pass to WR David Patten.

In the third quarter, the Saints increased their lead as RB Aaron Stecker managed to get a 6-yard TD run.  The Cards would sneak closer as Warner completed a 3-yard TD pass to rookie TE Ben Patrick.  However, New Orleans answered with kicker Martín Gramática getting a 31-yard field goal.  In the fourth quarter, Arizona tried to mount a comeback as kicker Neil Rackers nailed a 26-yard field goal.  However, the Saints defense was too much to overcome.

The Cardinals were officially eliminated from playoff contention the next day, after the Minnesota Vikings defeated the Chicago Bears, meaning again that the home team hosting the Super Bowl would not be participating therein.

With the loss, the Cardinals fell to 6–8.

Week 16

With the win, the Cardinals improved to 7–8.

Week 17

With the win, the Cardinals improved to 8–8. The 29-point victory allowed the Cardinals to finish the season with a positive point differential (404 scored, 399 allowed) for the first time since 1993.

References

Arizona
Arizona Cardinals seasons
Arizona